Serhiy Ivanovych Nayev (born 30 April 1970) is the Commander of the Joint Forces the Armed Forces of Ukraine (since 27 March 2020), holding the rank of Lieutenant general from December 2016.

Biography 
Serhii Nayev was born on 30 April 1970, in Mohyliv-Podilskyi, Vinnytsia oblast.

From 1987 to 1991, he studied at the Moscow Higher Military Command School, after which he obtained the military rank of lieutenant.

From 1991 to 1993 he served as a commander of the motorized infantry platoon in one of the units of the Group of Soviet Forces in Germany.

In 2014, he was the head of Sector B during the battles for Donetsk airport.

Serhiy Nayev served in as a commander of Ukraine’s operative command “The East” from 2015 to 2017, and previously as a chief executive officer at “The South” command.

In March 2018 Viktor Muzhenko, the head of the General Staff of the Ukrainian Armed Forces, appointed Nayev as his deputy.

On 28 April 2022, he was awarded Hero of Ukraine by President Volodymyr Zelenskyy.

References

1970 births
Living people
People from Mohyliv-Podilskyi
Recipients of the Order of Gold Star (Ukraine)
Lieutenant generals of Ukraine
Ukrainian military personnel of the 2022 Russian invasion of Ukraine